Brazil is the largest country in both South America and Latin America.

Brazil or Brasil may also refer to:

Film and television 
 Brazil (1944 film), a musical comedy starring Tito Guízar and Virginia Bruce, about a composer masquerading as twins
 Brazil (1985 film), a dystopian black comedy by Terry Gilliam
 Brasil (film), a 2002 short film by F. Javier Gutiérrez
 Rede Brasil de Televisão, also known as Rede Brasil; a Brazilian TV network
 TV Brasil, a Brazilian TV network

Music
 Brazil (band), a 2000s American rock band

Albums
 Brasil (1981 album), by João Gilberto with Caetano Veloso, Gilberto Gil and Maria Bethânia
 Brasil (The Manhattan Transfer album), 1987
 Brasil (Ratos de Porão album), 1989
 Brazil (Men at Work album), 1998
 Brazil (The Ritchie Family album), 1975
 Brazil (Rosemary Clooney album), 2000
 Brazil: Forró - Music for Maids and Taxi Drivers, 1989
 Brazil: Once Again, by Herbie Mann, 1978
 Brazil (EP), by Loona, 2014

Songs
 "Aquarela do Brasil" or "Brazil", written by Ary Barroso, 1939; covered by many performers
 "Brasil" (Cazuza song), 1988
 "Brasil" (EOB song), 2019
 "Brazil" (Declan McKenna song), 2015
 "Brazil (2nd Edit)", by deadmau5, 2008
 "Brazil", by Bebi Dol, representing Yugoslavia in the Eurovision Song Contest 1991
 "Brazil", by Iggy Azalea from The End of an Era, 2021
 "Brazil", by Kenny G from Paradise

Places 
 Brasil (mythical island), a phantom island featured in Irish myths
 Empire of Brazil (1822–1889), a state largely encompassing the territories of modern Brazil and Uruguay
 Brazil, Indiana, U.S.
 Brazil, Iowa, U.S.
 Brazil, Mississippi, U.S.
 Brazil, Missouri, U.S.
 Monte Brasil, a peninsula in Azores, Portugal

Publications
 Agência Brasil, a Brazilian public news agency 
 Brazil (book), a 2012 book by Michael Palin
 Brazil (novel), a novel by John Updike
 "Brazil", one of Weebl's cartoons
 Jornal do Brasil, a private Brazilian newspaper

Technology 
 Brazil R/S, a rendering plug-in
 Brazil, code name for an edition of the Plan 9 from Bell Labs operating system
 Brazil, a class of locomotives build by Kerr, Stuart and Company

Other uses 
 Brazil (surname)
 Brasil (surname)

See also 
 Brazil national football team
 Brazil nut, a South American tree and the commercially harvested edible seed
 Brazile (disambiguation)
 Brazilian (disambiguation)
 Caesalpinia echinata, a tree, commonly known as Pau-Brasil
 United Kingdom of Portugal, Brazil and the Algarves (1815–1825)